Anna Notaras Palaiologina ( Παλαιολογίνα; died 8 July 1507) was the daughter of Loukas Notaras, the last megas doux of the Byzantine Empire.

Biography

Anna probably left Constantinople prior to fall of Constantinople in 1453, although the passenger manifest of a Genoese ship which escaped the siege on the morning of 29 May includes two entries for the family name Notaras. Her exact whereabouts before 1459 are not certain, but in that year she appeared in Italy and made claim to the Notaras family inheritance, held at the Bank of Saint George in Genoa. The fate of this large inheritance had become a diplomatic question during the six years following the death of Loukas Notaras. She had her younger brother, Jacob Notaras, disinherited on the grounds that he had converted to Islam while in captivity. She lived for a time in Rome before eventually settling in Venice, where she became the center of the Greek community in Venice.

She repeatedly petitioned the Republic to allow the construction of an Orthodox church within Venice (something not granted until 1539) and when the Council of Ten prevaricated, she badgered them into a compromise, allowing her to build an oratory within her own sizable Casa and hold Orthodox services within it from 1475. In 1498, the Venetian Senate finally granted their Greek community the right to found the Scuola di San Nicolò dei Greci, a confraternity which aided members of that community. Although Anna Notaras died in 1507, prior to the completion of San Giorgio dei Greci, she left three icons in her will to the church, where they remain today.

In 1499, the first exclusively Greek printing press in Venice began operation under the direction of Nikolaos Vlasto and Zacharias Kalliergis. The first product of the press was the Etymologicum Magnum and the dedication at the front thanks the ‘most modest lady Anna, daughter of…Loukas Notaras’ who had defrayed its cost.

In 1472 Anna began negotiations with the council of Siena to take possession of the old castle of Montauto and the surrounding lands in order to found a commune where Greeks could live "according to their laws and customs". In their correspondence with her, the council referred to her as the widow of the last Byzantine emperor, Constantine XI Palaiologos, but this was untrue. There is no mention of such a marriage in any other contemporary source, especially in the writings of George Sphrantzes, his chancellor. Although the legal contract was drawn up, the commune project went no further.

A friend of Cardinal Bessarion, Anna also recovered several Greek manuscripts from the east. In 1470 she acquired a 12th-century manuscript Catena of Job written for the Grand Duke of Cyprus. On March 2, 1489, Zabeta, widow of her brother Jacob, filed a petition before the judges of the Venetian Procurator alleging that Jacob had shortly before his death in Ancona, sent to his sister Anna "a box of law books of different kinds, both on parchment and on paper" of great value. She demanded that Anna hand over these works to her, or be ordered to pay her the sum of 120 ducats. Anna acknowledged receipt of this box but contended that most of the books had actually been bought by herself and been lent to Jacob. Anna won this court case and on 8 May 1490, Anna filed a petition against Zabeta, alleging that she had entered the Ca Notaras and stolen a valuable copy of Petrarch, which Anna had bought from Thomas Palaiologos in 1462, during his visit to Venice, which she valued at 51 ducats. The judge ruled in Anna's favour again.

Fictional portrayals

Anna Notaras appears as a central character in The Dark Angel by Mika Waltari and Porphyry and Ash by Peter Sandham. She also appears as a secondary character in The Three Kingdoms: The Sown Seed and the follow-up book, The Three Kingdoms: The Harsh Harvest. Both books penned by Mark J. Musser.

Notes

References
The Immortal Emperor, by Donald Nicol.

The Fall of Constantinople 1453, by Steven Runciman.
Short Biographical Lexicon of Byzantine Academics Immigrants to Western Europe, by Fotis Vassileiou, Barbara Saribalidou.

Further reading
Klaus-Peter Matschke, "The Notaras Family and Its Italian Connections", Dumbarton Oaks Papers: Symposium on Byzantium and the Italians, 13th-15th Centuries, 49 (1995), pp. 59–72.
 Silvia Ronchey, Un aristocratica Byzantina in fuga: Anna Notaras Paleologina. online copy at Academia.edu

1507 deaths
15th-century Venetian women
15th-century Byzantine women
15th-century Byzantine people
15th-century Greek people
Printers of incunabula
Greek expatriates in Italy
Constantinopolitan Greeks
Year of birth unknown
15th-century births
Renaissance women
People from Constantinople